Liu Xiaoyu (born on 25 June 1988 in Shenyang, Liaoning) is a Chinese female international swimmer. She competed for China at the 2012 London Olympics in the 100 m breaststroke.

See also 
 China at the 2012 Summer Olympics - Swimming

References 

1988 births
Living people
Olympic swimmers of China
Swimmers from Shenyang
Swimmers at the 2012 Summer Olympics
Chinese female breaststroke swimmers
20th-century Chinese women
21st-century Chinese women